Erin Thorn (born May 19, 1981) is an American professional basketball player.  She is currently playing for Tarbes GB in Tarbes, France.

Born in Orem, Utah, Thorn earned Ms. Basketball honors for the state of Utah in 1999. After accepting a scholarship to Brigham Young University, Thorn was a four-year starter at shooting guard for the women's basketball team. She graduated in 2003 with a degree in Fitness and Wellness Management.

BYU  statistics
Source

Professional career
Thorn was selected by the New York Liberty in the second round (17th overall pick) of the 2003 WNBA Draft, on April 25, 2003.  She became a starter in 2007 after Vickie Johnson and Becky Hammon departed the Liberty.  Thorn was named WNBA Eastern Conference Player of the Week for the week ending May 29, 2007.

In 2009 WNBA offseason, Thorn was signed as a free agent by the Chicago Sky and in the 2012 WNBA offseason agreed to a contract with the Minnesota Lynx. She currently plays for Tarbes GB in France. In the offseason, she has been serving as an assistant coach for her alma mater, Brigham Young University.

WNBA career statistics

Regular season

|-
| align="left" | 2003
| align="left" | New York
| 23 || 0 || 7.9 || .310 || .242 || 1.000 || 0.5 || 0.7 || 0.2 || 0.0 || 0.6 || 1.9
|-
| align="left" | 2004
| align="left" | New York
| 17 || 1 || 9.2 || .267 || .290 || .500 || 0.5 || 0.5 || 0.2 || 0.1 || 0.5 || 2.0
|-
| align="left" | 2005
| align="left" | New York
| 21 || 0 || 9.7 || .389 || .345 || 1.000 || 0.7 || 0.6 || 0.2 || 0.0 || 0.3 || 2.7
|-
| align="left" | 2006
| align="left" | New York
| 27 || 1 || 14.0 || .417 || .431 || .903 || 1.4 || 1.2 || 0.2 || 0.0 || 0.7 || 6.1
|-
| align="left" | 2007
| align="left" | New York
| 29 || 29 || 30.4 || .424 || .390 || .735 || 3.0 || 2.5 || 0.9 || 0.0 || 1.7 || 9.7
|-
| align="left" | 2008
| align="left" | New York
| 32 || 5 || 11.9 || .340 || .268 || .909 || 0.6 || 1.1 || 0.2 || 0.1 || 0.6 || 3.2
|-
| align="left" | 2009
| align="left" | Chicago
| 34 || 0 || 17.0 || .424 || .402 || .909 || 1.6 || 1.6 || 0.6 || 0.0 || 0.9 || 6.2
|-
| align="left" | 2010
| align="left" | Chicago
| 34 || 0 || 20.1 || .412 || .420 || .889 || 1.9 || 2.1 || 0.6 || 0.1 || 1.3 || 6.3
|-
| align="left" | 2011
| align="left" | Chicago
| 34 || 7 || 16.8 || .405 || .395 || .947 || 1.7 || 2.4 || 0.3 || 0.1 || 1.7 || 5.4
|-
| align="left" | 2012
| align="left" | Minnesota
| 26 || 0 || 7.5 || .362 || .353 || 1.000 || 0.9 || 0.9 || 0.2 || 0.0 || 0.5 || 2.0
|-
| align="left" | 2013
| align="left" | Indiana
| 6 || 0 || 11.2 || .167 || .167 || 1.000 || 0.5 || 0.7 || 0.3 || 0.2 || 0.8 || 1.2
|-
| align="left" | Career
| align="left" | 11 years, 4 teams
| 283 || 43 || 15.1 || .395 || .370 || .883 || 1.3 ||| 1.5 || 0.4 || 0.0 || 1.0 || 4.8

Playoffs

|-
| align="left" | 2004
| align="left" | New York
| 2 || 0 || 1.5 || 1.000 || 1.000 || .000 || 0.0 || 0.0 || 0.0 || 0.0 || 0.0 || 1.5
|-
| align="left" | 2005
| align="left" | New York
| 2 || 0 || 5.0 || .500 || .000 || .000 || 0.0 || 0.0 || 0.0 || 0.0 || 0.0 || 1.0
|-
| align="left" | 2007
| align="left" | New York
| 3 || 3 || 24.7 || .455 || .375 || .000 || 3.0 || 2.0 || 0.7 || 0.0 || 1.0 || 4.3
|-
| align="left" | 2008
| align="left" | New York
| 6 || 0 || 10.3 || .583 || .571 || .857 || 0.3 || 1.0 || 0.2 || 0.0 || 0.8 || 4.0
|-
| align="left" | 2012
| align="left" | Minnesota
| 6 || 0 || 3.0 || .667 || .600 || 1.000 || 0.3 || 0.2 || 0.0 || 0.2 || 0.5 || 2.7
|-
| align="left" | Career
| align="left" | 5 years, 2 teams
| 19 || 3 || 8.8 || .571 || .524 || .875 || 0.7 || 0.7 || 0.2 || 0.1 || 0.6 || 3.1

Notes

External links 
Basketball Reference
WNBA Player Profile
2003 WNBA Player Prospectus

1981 births
Living people
American expatriate basketball people in Greece
American women's basketball coaches
American women's basketball players
Basketball players from Utah
BYU Cougars women's basketball coaches
BYU Cougars women's basketball players
Chicago Sky players
Indiana Fever players
Minnesota Lynx players
New York Liberty draft picks
New York Liberty players
Panathinaikos WBC players
Sportspeople from Orem, Utah
Shooting guards
Tarbes Gespe Bigorre players